Amphibolia is a genus of plant in family Aizoaceae.

Species include:

 Amphibolia obscura H.E.K.Hartmann

References 

 
Aizoaceae genera
Taxonomy articles created by Polbot
Taxa named by Louisa Bolus